Steatosoma is a genus of parasitic flies in the family Tachinidae. There are at least two described species in Steatosoma.

Species
These two species belong to the genus Steatosoma:
 Steatosoma nigriventris Aldrich, 1934
 Steatosoma rufiventris Aldrich, 1934

References

Further reading

 
 
 
 

Tachinidae
Articles created by Qbugbot